Kırkkuyu is a village in the central district of Şırnak Province in Turkey. The village is populated by Kurds of the Dêrşewî tribe and had a population of 105 in 2021. The hamlets of Sucular and Şişli are attached to Kırkkuyu.

The village was depopulated in the 1990s during the Kurdish–Turkish conflict.

References 

Kurdish settlements in Şırnak Province
Villages in Şırnak District